The Surbiton Trophy is a tennis tournament for male and female professional players played on grass courts. The event was held annually in Surbiton, England, from 1997 through 2008 as part of the ATP Challenger Series and ITF Women's Circuit. In 2009, it was replaced by the Aegon Trophy in Nottingham. In 2015, the event resumed on both the ATP Challenger Tour and ITF Women's Circuit.

The tournament was not held in 2020 and 2021 because of the COVID-19 pandemic, but returned in 2022. 

Jim Thomas is the doubles record holder with four titles, while Kristina Brandi is the singles record holder with three titles, including back to back wins.

As of 2022, no player has won both the singles and doubles titles in the same year.

Past finals

Men's singles

Men's doubles

Women's singles

Women's doubles

See also
List of tennis tournaments

References

External links
Official website

 
Tennis tournaments in England
Grass court tennis tournaments
ATP Challenger Tour
ITF Women's World Tennis Tour
1997 establishments in England
Recurring sporting events established in 1997
Sport in the Royal Borough of Kingston upon Thames
Surbiton